Colonel William Paterson, FRS (17 August 1755 – 21 June 1810) was a Scottish soldier, explorer, Lieutenant Governor and botanist best known for leading early settlement at Port Dalrymple in Tasmania. In 1795, Paterson gave an order that resulted in the massacre of a number of men, women and children, members of the Bediagal tribe.

Early years
A native of Montrose, Scotland, Paterson was interested in botany as a boy and trained in horticulture at Syon in London. Paterson was sent to the Cape Colony by the wealthy and eccentric Countess of Strathmore to collect plants, he arrived in Table Bay on board the "Houghton" in May 1777. He made four trips into the interior between May 1777 and March 1780, when he departed. In 1789 Paterson published Narrative of Four Journeys into the Country of the Hottentots and Caffraria, which he dedicated to Sir Joseph Banks.

Career
Paterson was originally commissioned as an ensign in the 98th Regiment of Foot and served in India. He later transferred to the 73rd Regiment of Foot after the 98th's disbandment in 1787. In 1789, he was promoted to captain in the New South Wales Corps, serving under Major Francis Grose. After some time spent recruiting, he arrived in Sydney in October 1791. From November 1791 until March 1793 he served in command on Norfolk Island. Whilst there he collected botanical, geological and insect specimens and sent them to Banks. He also provided seed to the Lee and Kennedy and Colvill nurseries.  He was elected a Fellow of the Royal Society in May 1798.

In 1794 he served for a year as Lieutenant Governor of New South Wales. In 1800 he was re-appointed to the post and served a second term until 1808.

In May 1795, following the alleged killing of two settlers Paterson ordered two officers and 66 soldiers to:

 destroy as many (Aboriginal Australians) as they could meet with ... in the hope of striking terror, to erect gibbets in different places, whereon the bodies of all they might kill were to be hung ...

Seven or eight Bediagal people were killed. A crippled man, some children and five women (one being heavily pregnant) were taken to Sydney as prisoners. One of the women and her baby had serious gunshot wounds. The child died not long after as did the newborn baby of the pregnant woman.

In 1801, Paterson fought a duel with John Macarthur and was wounded in the shoulder.
 
He led an expedition to the Hunter Region in 1801 and up the Paterson River (later named in his honour by Governor King). The expedition discovered coal in the area that would later become the vast South Maitland Coalfields; it was a discovery of great economic significance. In 1804, he led an expedition to Port Dalrymple, in what is now Tasmania, exploring the Tamar River and going up the North Esk River farther than European had previously gone.

Between 1804 and 1808 Paterson was also appointed Commandant at Port Dalrymple, the administrator of the colony in the north of Van Diemen's Land. In 1806, Paterson's duties as commander of the New South Wales Corps required him to return to Sydney, but he went back to Van Diemen's Land in 1807, and stayed until December 1808. During this time he corresponded regularly with the eminent naturalist Sir Joseph Banks, sending a number of specimens.

The New South Wales Corps selected Paterson as acting Governor of New South Wales on 1 January 1809 after the deposition of Governor Captain William Bligh in the so-called "Rum Rebellion." He was replaced by the newly arrived Lachlan Macquarie by the end of the year. He left Sydney for England on 12 May 1810, but died on board HMS Dromedary while off Cape Horn just a few weeks later.

His widow Elizabeth married Francis Grose, Paterson's predecessor as Lieutenant Governor, in April 1814, but Grose died a month later. Elizabeth died in Liverpool, England in 1839.

References

Bibliography

Further reading
 Alexander, Alison (editor) (2005), The Companion to Tasmanian History, Centre for Tasmanian Historical Studies, University of Tasmania, Hobart. .
 Vernon S. Forbes and John Rourke (1980), Paterson's Cape Travels, 1777 to 1779, Johannesburg, Brenthurst Press. 
 Leonard Guelke and Jeanne K. Guelke (2004), 'Imperial eyes on South Africa: reassessing travel narratives', Journal of Historical Geography. 
 Robson, L.L. (1983) A history of Tasmania. Volume 1. Van Diemen's Land from the earliest times to 1855, Melbourne, Oxford University Press. 
 Anne-Maree Whitaker (2004), 'Mrs Paterson's keepsakes: the provenance of some significant colonial documents and paintings', Journal of the Royal Australian Historical Society. 
 Brendan Whiting (2004), Victims of Tyranny: The Story of the Fitzgerald Convict Brothers, Harbour Publishing.

External links 

 Short biography from the Australian National Botanic Gardens

1755 births
1810 deaths
18th-century explorers
19th-century explorers
People from Montrose, Angus
Botanists with author abbreviations
73rd Regiment of Foot officers
Botanists active in Australia
Explorers of Australia
Lieutenant-Governors of New South Wales
Governors of Tasmania
People who died at sea
Scottish botanists
Scottish explorers
Fellows of the Royal Society
Colony of New South Wales people
Explorers of Africa
Australian duellists